CCGS Private Robertson V.C. is the first vessel of the Canadian Coast Guard's s. The ship entered service in 2012, tasked with enforcing Canadian maritime law within Canada's nautical borders. The ship is in active service and is based at Sarnia, Ontario and is used to patrol the Great Lakes.

Description
The patrol vessel is also equipped with two Northern Lights M1066 generators and one Northern Lights M1064 emergency generator. The ship has a complement of nine with five officers and four crew and has five additional berths. The ship is equipped with Sperry Marine Visionmaster FT navigational radar operating on the X and S-bands.

Service history
The ship was ordered from Irving Shipbuilding in 2009 and the ship's keel was laid down at Halifax Shipyards in Halifax, Nova Scotia with the yard number 6094. The ship was launched in 2012 and completed in July of that year, the first of the class. Private Robertson V.C. entered service in 2013 and is based at Sarnia, Ontario. The vessel is named after James Peter Robertson, a winner of the Victoria Cross in the First World War.

On 10 February 2011 the London Free Press reported that Private Robertson V.C., and her sister ship  will patrol the Great Lakes. Private Robertson V.C. is based at Sarnia, Ontario. In February 2017, Private Robertson V.C. was among the Canadian Coast Guard ships named in a report claiming poisoned water aboard some vessels. In October 2019, Private Robertson V.C. was re-assigned to the West Coast of Canada to allow the vessels stationed there to undergo refits, sailing via the Panama Canal.

References

Sources
 

Hero-class patrol vessels
2012 ships
Ships built in Nova Scotia
Patrol vessels of the Canadian Coast Guard